Robert Struble (1899–1967) was a political figure and social welfare reformer in Washington from the post-World War II years until his death in Seattle on July 26, 1967.

Career 
From 1949 to 1953 Struble was chief assistant to Jack Taylor, Washington State Commissioner of Public Lands.  He also pioneered welfare reform in Washington state during his years (1957–1967) with the non-disabled program (NDVR) within the state Division of Vocational Rehabilitation.  Under Struble's leadership, the NDVR program attracted national attention for its initiative in converting welfare from handouts to career retraining.  Administratively, NDVR sought to apply the proverb about teaching people how to fish rather than merely giving fish to needy people.

In the mid-1950s, during the nascency of television in Spokane, Struble was an executive with KXLY.

Awards and honors 
He was a U.S. veteran of both World Wars, and was awarded the Purple Heart for service in France during World War I.

Family 
He was the grandnephew of ex-Iowa Congressman Isaac Struble and the first cousin of football hall-of-famer Max Krause.

Excerpt from Look article on welfare reform, 1965
"She (Alicia Carlington) could have dimmed her ambitions and thus found help within the rules of the welfare system.  But she would then have failed.  That she did not have to fail is a tribute to the humanity of Johnson, Struble, Murphy and others who cared enough to become involved with another person, to give part of themselves, to go out of their way – to use all the human resources of a system that is too often applied impersonally, thoughtlessly, grimly.  They dared to break, or at least bend, some of the habits that so often make a prison of a society crammed with treasures.

"Why did they do it?  Perhaps they are better men than most; perhaps they saw in Mrs. Carlington an uncommon spirit and a chance for a return on their risk.  Whatever the reason, Mrs. Carlington got the help she had to have.  She used it."  (See below, References, J. Polly article)

References

 Welfare Reform
 Rev. Erle Howell, "Vocational rehabilitation of nondisabled: It Works to Everyone's Gain," Seattle Times, July 10, 1960, p. 10.
 Current Washington State Department of Vocational Rehabilitation website (DVR)
 "Discussing progress of rehabilitation...," Your Public Schools, Washington State Superintendent of Public Instruction publication, hereafter cited SPI, vol. 3 (Fall 1964), p. 11.
 John  Polly, "Triumph of a Stubborn Lady," Look (February 9, 1965), pp. 64–69.  Represents national attention focused on the state program, NDVR (Non-disabled Vocational Rehabilitation). Polly, Look'''s senior editor, chronicles how NDVR helped young mother of five, Alicia Carlington, achieve a career worthy of her abilities and adequate to meet her family's material needs.  The article references Winn Johnson, a guidance counselor at North Thurston High School when Carlington attended, and John Murphy, her caseworker at NDVR.  When Carlington entered the program, Struble was NDVR supervisor of Murphy's Seattle office; Struble was NDVR state supervisor by the time Carlington became financially self-supporting.
 Seattle Times, March 10, 1965, March 11, 1965, follow-up articles on J. Polly, ibid. "4300 Helped by Rehab Division," Your Public Schools, SPI, vol. 5 (October 1966), p. 5.
 "75,000 In State Need Rehabilitation Service," Vocational Rehabilitation Outlook'', SPI, vol. 3 (Winter, 1966), p. 7.
 "Quite a Life: Bob Struble, Sr." (2002).  In the Concluding section this biography notes the Jeffersonian breath of Struble's undertakings: ..."He engaged actively in sports, horses, playing in a marching band, soldiering, inventing, mining, surveying, salesmanship, promoting rodeos, deputy sheriff, pioneering television, and various avenues of politics, of which his work on the state pollution control commission was not without redeeming social qualities.  His last job--also the longest in duration--was devoted to helping the needy and to rehabilitating wrecked lives."

Washington (state) politicians
1967 deaths
1899 births